The Srem District is one of seven administrative districts of the autonomous province of Vojvodina, Serbia. It lies in the geographical regions of Syrmia and Mačva. According to the 2011 census results, it has a population of 312,278 inhabitants. The administrative center is the city of Sremska Mitrovica.

Name
In Serbian, the district is known as Sremski okrug, in Croatian as Srijemski okrug, in Hungarian as Szerémségi Körzet, in Slovak as Sriemskí okres, in Rusyn as Srimski okruh (Сримски окрух), and in Romanian as Districtul Srem.

Administration
The Srem District is one of seven districts (first-level administrative divisions) of Vojvodina (and 29 of Serbia). Districts are regional centers and do not have any form of self-government. The District includes the municipalities of:

 Inđija
 Irig
 Pećinci
 Ruma
 Sremska Mitrovica
 Stara Pazova
 Šid

History
In Late antiquity, between the 3rd and 5th centuries, the city of Sirmium (present-day Sremska Mitrovica) was a capital of the Roman province of Pannonia Secunda. In the 6th century Sirmium was the capital of Byzantine Pannonia. In the 7th century, during Avar administration, the area was ruled by Bulgar local ruler Kuber, while in the 11th century, it was ruled by independent Bulgarian-Slavic duke Sermon. In the 11th century, it was part of the Byzantine Theme of Sirmium.

During the administration of the medieval Kingdom of Hungary (12th–16th century), the area was divided between Sirmiensis and Valkoensis counties. During Ottoman administration (16th–18th century), the area was initially a part of the vassal Ottoman duchy of Syrmia ruled by Serb duke Radoslav Čelnik and was subsequently included into the Sanjak of Syrmia.

At the end of the Austro-Russian-Turkish War of 1735-1739, there was a migration of Albanians from the Kelmendi tribe to Srem, who were recorded as speaking Albanian as late as 1921.

During Habsburg administration (18th-19th century), the area was divided between the Syrmia County and the Military Frontier. In the 1850s, northern parts of the area were part of the Novi Sad District, but were again included into Syrmia County after 1860. Since the abolishment of the Military Frontier in 1882, Syrmian parts of the Frontier were also included into Syrmia County.

During the royal Serb-Croat-Slovene (Yugoslav) administration (1918-1941), the area was part of the Syrmia County (1918-1922) and Syrmia Oblast (1922-1929). From 1929 to 1931, the area was divided between Danube Banovina in the north-east and Drina Banovina in the south-west, while from 1931 to 1939 the area was part of the Danube Banovina. From 1939 to 1941, north-western parts of the area were part of the Banovina of Croatia.

During the German-Croatian Axis occupation (1941-1944), the area was included into the Grand County of Vuka. Since 1944, the area was part of autonomous Yugoslav Vojvodina (which was part of new socialist Yugoslav Serbia since 1945). The present-day districts of Serbia (including Syrmia District) were defined by the Government of Serbia's Enactment of 29 January 1992.

Demographics

According to the last official census done in 2011, the Srem District has 312,278 inhabitants.

Ethnic groups
Ethnic composition of the Srem district:

Culture
The monasteries on the Fruška Gora mountain are the greatest cultural treasures of this region. They include the Grgeteg Monastery from 1471 and the Jazak Monastery from 1522.

The Krušedol Monastery is a true treasury of the Vojvodinan painting. It was founded in 1514 as an endowment of Orthodox bishop Maksim Branković and his mother Angelina.

In the Novo Hopovo Monastery, the church architecture and fresco paintings are particularly attractive. The exact time of its first construction is unknown, but 1765 is known as the year of its reconstruction.

See also
 Administrative divisions of Serbia
 Districts of Serbia

References

Note: All official material made by Government of Serbia is public by law. Information was taken from official website.

External links

 www.sremski.okrug.gov.rs

 
Geography of Vojvodina
Districts of Vojvodina
Syrmia
Mačva
Rusyn communities